Rotenboden is a railway station on the Gornergrat railway, a rack railway which links the resort of Zermatt with the summit of the Gornergrat. The station is situated west of the Gornergrat, in the Swiss municipality of Zermatt and canton of Valais.

From the railway station a trail leads to the Monte Rosa Hut, across the Gorner Glacier.

See also
 List of highest railway stations in Switzerland

References

External links

Railway stations in the canton of Valais
Gornergrat Railway stations
Railway stations in Switzerland opened in 1898